John Carrafa is an American theater and film director/choreographer best known as the two-time Tony Award nominated choreographer of the Broadway musicals Urinetown and Into The Woods and the Media Choreography Honors Award winner for the Robert Zemeckis film The Polar Express.

He was a dancer and assistant to Twyla Tharp before becoming a choreographer and director for Broadway, film and television.

He currently resides in New York City and in Los Angeles California.

Broadway and theater
Love! Valour! Compassion! - Off-Broadway (1994) Broadway (1995)
Dirty Blonde - Off-Broadway (2000) and Broadway (2001)
Urinetown - Off-Broadway (2001) and Broadway (2002)
A Little Night Music - Kennedy Center Sondheim Celebration, 2002
Into The Woods - Broadway (2002)
Dance of the Vampires - Broadway (2003)
Good Vibrations - Broadway (2005)

Filmography

Love! Valour! Compassion! - (1997)
The Last Days of Disco - (1998)
The Thomas Crown Affair - (1999)
The Polar Express - (2004)
Who's The Top? - (2005)
The Other Guys - (2010)
Something Borrowed - (2011)

Television

Sex and The City - (1999)
Big Love - (2010)
Ugly Betty - (2009)
Blue Bloods - (2011)
The Big C - (2012)
Elementary - (2012)
Nashville - (2013)
Nurse Jackie - (2013)
Last Week Tonight - (2019)

Awards

World Dance Award for Feature Film - (2012)
Director of Best Musical Daegu International Theater Festival - *"Academy" (2010)
Honorable Mention Best Director NYMF - *"Academy" (2009)
Joseph Jefferson Award - *"Animal Crackers" (2009) Nomination
Media Choreography Honors - for *"The Polar Express" (2005)
Dora Award - *"Urinetown" (2004)
Drama Desk - *"Urinetown" (2001) Nomination
Lucille Lortel Award - *"Urinetown" (2001)
Outer Critics Circle Award - *"Urinetown" (2001) Nomination
Tony Award - *"Urinetown" (2002) Nomination
Tony Award - *"Into The Woods" (2002) Nomination

External links

Official Site
Playbill.com article, May 23, 2002
Stepping Into Success - NY Times 2002

American choreographers
Living people
Year of birth missing (living people)